The 1964 1. divisjon was the 20th completed season of top division football in Norway.

Overview
It was contested by 10 teams, and FC Lyn Oslo won their first championship title. At the time, Lyn Oslo's 26 points were a record for the most points in one season. Brann and Raufoss were relegated to the 2. divisjon.

This season, two spots in the European Cup were awarded. Lyn lead the league after 9 rounds and qualified for the 1964–65 European Cup. At the end of the season, Lyn won the league, their first league title, and qualified also for the 1965–66 European Cup. This was the last Norwegian top flight season, the leader after half a season were awarded a European Cup spot.

Teams and locations
''Note: Table lists in alphabetical order.

League table

Results

Season statistics

Top scorer
 Ole Stavrum, Lyn – 18 goals

Attendance

References
 Norway - List of final tables (RSSSF)

Eliteserien seasons
Norway
Norway
1